The Charles Baldwin House is a historic house in northeastern Salt Lake City, Utah, United States, that is located within the University Neighborhood Historic District, but is individually listed on the National Register of Historic Places (NRHP).

Description
The house is located at 229 South 1200 East. It was built in 1890 for Charles Baldwin, who served as United States Commissioner and Referee in Bankruptcy for the United States District Court from 1898 to 1921. Baldwin was also at one time the president of the Salt Lake City Board of Education and the Utah State Bar Association. His house was designed in the Victorian Eclectic style, with Queen Anne and Eastlake features. It was acquired in 1921 by Louis A. Thody, an immigrant from England who founded the X-Ray Department at the LDS Hospital and later co-founded the Coray-Thody X-Ray Laboratory. The house has been listed on the National Register of Historic Places since February 11, 1982.

See also

 National Register of Historic Places listings in Salt Lake City

References

External links

		
National Register of Historic Places in Salt Lake City
Victorian architecture in Utah
Queen Anne architecture in Utah
Houses completed in 1890
1890 establishments in Utah Territory